Toumine may refer to:

Toumine, alternate spelling for Tumin, a village in Syria
Nesta Toumine (1912–1996), Canadian dancer, choreographer, artistic director and teacher

See also
Tumin (disambiguation)